Imputed rent is the rental price an individual would pay for an asset they own. The concept applies to any capital good, but it is most commonly used in housing markets to measure the rent homeowners would pay for a housing unit equivalent to the one they own. Imputing housing rent is necessary to measure economic activity in national accounts. Because asset owners do not pay rent, owners' imputed rent must be measured indirectly.

Imputed housing rent is the economic theory of imputation applied to real estate: that the value is more a matter of what the buyer is willing to pay than the cost the seller incurs to create it. In this case, market rents are used to estimate the value to the property owner. Thus, imputed rent offers a way to compare homeowners' and tenants' economic decisions.

More formally, in owner-occupancy, the landlord–tenant relationship is short-circuited. Consider a model: two people, A and B, each of whom owns property.  If A lives in B's property, and B lives in A's, two financial transactions take place: each pays rent to the other. But if A and B are both owner-occupiers, no money changes hands even though the same economic relationships exists; there are still two owners and two occupiers, but the transactions between them no longer go through the market. The amount that would have changed hands had the owner and occupier been different persons is the imputed rent. Imputed rents can alternatively be understood as returns to investments in assets. On these grounds, imputed rents might be included in disposable income, e.g. when calculating indices of income distribution.

Measurement
There are two common approaches to estimating imputed rents for housing: the comparison approach and the user cost of capital approach. 

The comparison approach matches rents in tenant-occupied housing units to similar owner-occupied housing units. If the units are identical, the owner-occupant's imputed rent is the cost they avoid in renting the other unit. 

The user cost approach identifies costs unrecoverable by the owner. These can be defined as:

Where i is the interest rate, rp is the property tax rate, m is the cost of maintenance, and d is depreciation. The rent is the sum of these rates multiplied by the price of the house. More detailed user cost models consider differential interest costs for housing debt and owner equity and the tax treatment of housing capital income.

Effects of owner-occupancy

 Imputed rents disappear from measures of national income and output, unless figures are added to take them into account.
 The government loses the opportunity to tax the transaction. Sometimes, governments have attempted to tax the imputed rent (Schedule A of United Kingdom's income tax used to do that), but it tends to be unpopular. Some countries still tax the imputed rent, such as Belgium, Iceland, Luxembourg, the Netherlands, Slovenia, Spain and Switzerland. The absence of taxes on imputed rents is also referred to as Home-Ownership Bias.

In population datasets like the Cross-National Equivalent File, imputed rent is estimated:
 for owner-occupiers, as a small percentage (4–6%) of the capital accrued in the property
 for public housing tenants, as the difference between rent paid and the average rent for a similar property in the same location
 for those living rent-free, as the estimate of the rent they would have to pay to rent a similar property in the same location
 for renters in the private market, as zero

Extending the principle

If imputed rent can be applied to housing, it can likewise apply to any good that can be rented, including automobiles and furniture: "In principle, the BEA should also include imputed rent for things like cars, and even furniture, but compared to housing, it’s such a small part of the economy that it’s not worth the effort."

See also
 Imputed income
 Land value tax
 Property tax

References

Renting
Urban, rural, and regional economics